The Open the Dream Gate Championship is a professional wrestling  championship created and promoted by the Japanese promotion Dragon Gate. The wrestler who holds it is considered the top singles wrestler in Dragon Gate. It was created on July 4, 2004 when Cima was awarded the title as a result of being the last Último Dragón Gym Champion.

Description

The title belt's face has a "gate" on it represented by a hinged metallic door which contains a plate with the titleholders' name. Any official challenger for the belt carries a key used to open the gate with, and should they win the title, then they can open the gate and put their name inside it. However, if the title is successfully defended, then the key is added to the main plate of the belt as a symbol of the respective successful defense. The original title belt was lost following Dragon Gate's July 20, 2015 event, which forced the promotion to create a new belt, which debuted on August 16, 2015.

History
Title reigns are determined either by professional wrestling matches between different wrestlers involved in pre-existing scripted feuds, plots, and storylines, or by scripted circumstances. Wrestlers were portrayed as either villains or heroes as they followed a series of tension-building events, which culminated in a wrestling match or series of matches for the championship.

There have been a total of 19 recognized champions who have had a combined 36 official reigns. The current champion is Shun Skywalker who is in his second reign.

Reigns

Combined reigns

See also
 Dragon Gate
 Open the Freedom Gate Championship

References

External links
 Official title history
 DGUSA title history
 Wrestling-Titles.com
Open The Dream Gate Championship

Dragon Gate (wrestling) championships
Openweight wrestling championships